The 2017 TT Super League season is the inaugural season under the title of the TT Super League and the fifteenth season for second tier association football clubs in Trinidad and Tobago, since its establishment in 2003. The league comprises 19 teams playing in two divisions. 12 teams play in League 1 and 7 teams play in League 2. League 1 began on June 11, 2017 and ended on December 10, 2017 with the crowning of Guaya United as champions. League 2 began on June 24, 2017 and ended on September 30, 2017 with the crowning of Petit Valley/Diego Martin United as champions.

League 1

Stadia and locations

League table

Results

Matches 1–22

Top scorers

Top assists

League 2

Stadia and locations

League table

Results

Matches 1–12

Top scorers

References

External links 
Official Website

2017
TT Super League